Horns Up may refer to:

 Horns Up (radio), a radio heavy metal program airing on KLOS
 "Horns Up", a song by Jackyl from their 2012 album Best in Show